Tumbaga is the name for a non-specific alloy of gold and copper given by Spanish Conquistadors to metals composed of these elements found in widespread use in pre-Columbian Mesoamerica in North America and South America.

The term is believed to be a borrowing from Tagalog tumbaga which in turn came from Malay , meaning 'copper' or 'brass'. It has also been spelled tumbago in literature.

Composition and properties
Tumbaga is an alloy composed mostly of gold and copper. It has a significantly lower melting point than gold or copper alone. It is harder than copper, but maintains malleability after being pounded.

Tumbaga can be treated with a simple acid, like citric acid, to dissolve copper off the surface. What remains is a shiny layer of nearly pure gold on top of a harder, more durable copper-gold alloy sheet. This process is referred to as depletion gilding.

Use and function
Tumbaga was widely used by the pre-Columbian cultures of South and Central America to make religious objects. Like most gold alloys, tumbaga was versatile and could be cast, drawn, hammered, gilded, soldered, welded, plated, hardened, annealed, polished, engraved, embossed, and inlaid.

The proportion of gold to copper in artifacts varies widely; items have been found with as much as 97% gold while others instead contain 97% copper. Some tumbaga has also been found to be composed of metals besides gold and copper, up to 18% of the total mass of the tumbaga.

Tumbaga objects were often made using a combination of the lost wax technique and depletion gilding. An alloy of varying proportions of copper, silver, and gold (typically in a percentage ratio of 80:15:5) was cast. After removal it was burned, turning surface copper into copper oxide, which was then mechanically removed The object was then placed in an oxidizing solution likely composed of sodium chloride (salt) and ferric sulfate. This dissolved the silver from the surface, leaving only gold. When viewed through a microscope, voids appear where the copper and silver had been.

The "Tumbaga" Wreck

In 1992, approximately 200 silver "tumbaga" bars were recovered in wreckage off Grand Bahama Island. They were composed mainly of silver, copper, and gold plundered by the Spaniards during the conquests of Cortés and hastily melted into bars of tumbaga for transport across the Atlantic. Such bars were typically melted back into their constituent metals in Spain.

See also

References

External links
 Shipwreck recovered right after the conquest of Cortés with tumbaga gold bars
 The "Tumbaga" Saga: Treasure of the Conquistadors. Book about Tumbaga Bars
The Art of Precolumbian Gold: The Jan Mitchell Collection, an exhibition catalog from The Metropolitan Museum of Art (fully available online as PDF), which contains material on Tumbaga

Copper alloys
Gold
Science and technology in Mesoamerica
Precious metal alloys